Mootez Zaddem (born 5 January 2001 in Sousse) is a Tunisian professional footballer who plays as a midfielder for Espérance de Tunis and the Tunisia national team.

Club career 
On 10 September 2021, Zaddem moved to Étoile Sportive du Sahel on a one-year loan from Valmeria.

International career 
With the under 20s, he participated in the Africa U-20 Cup of Nations in 2021. During this competition held in Mauritania, he played six games. Tunisia ranked fourth in the tournament, losing to the Gambia in the match for third place.

Zaddem made his international debut for Tunisia on 3 December 2021, coming off the bench in the 86th minute against the Syria national football team. He was part of the squad that were runners-up in the 2021 FIFA Arab Cup.

Honours 

 Finalist of the 2021 FIFA Arab Cup with the Tunisian team

References

External links

 

2001 births
Living people
Tunisian footballers
Association football midfielders
Valmieras FK players
Étoile Sportive du Sahel players
Espérance Sportive de Tunis players
Latvian Higher League players
Tunisian Ligue Professionnelle 1 players
Tunisian expatriate footballers
Expatriate footballers in Latvia

Tunisia international footballers